Not Tonight is a role-playing adventure game by British studio PanicBarn, released for Microsoft Windows in August 2018, and for Nintendo Switch (as Not Tonight: Take Back Control Edition) on 31 January 2020, the actual date of the United Kingdom leaving the European Union. Set in an alternate timeline shortly after the United Kingdom's vote to leave the European Union, the player takes the role of a citizen of European heritage who must survive under an authoritarian British government, working as a bouncer across various venues and earning enough to avoid deportation. Along the way, the player must make decisions on whether to change the course of events or remain complicit with the new administration.

A downloadable content game called Not Tonight: One Love was released for Steam on 25 June 2019; the DLC later came bundled up for the Take Back Control Edition at the time of the game's release.

A sequel, Not Tonight 2, was announced in August 2021, and was released on 11 February 2022.

Gameplay 
The gameplay of Not Tonight is based on the responsibilities of a bouncer, working in Albion (England) as a person of European heritage who was newly stripped of his or her British citizenship and has become stateless. As a bouncer, the player must analyse various parts of the guests' identification cards, checking whether they are under age, have provided expired documents, have provided fraudulent information, are hiding contraband, or have an incorrectly matching photograph, and determine whether to allow entry to an establishment. As the game progresses, the player must undertake additional measures as requested by larger venues or by the state. This includes: stopping various nationalities from entering, those who wear certain clothing, individuals who are not on the guest list, people without tickets, and various other rules as gameplay becomes more challenging. Additionally, the player can also accept bribes which will immediately gain money at the expense of losing social credit score (similar to the philosophy of social credit system). Failing to pass a mission will lower credit score. A loss of social credit can prevent the player from gaining more jobs and damage their progress, and will result in the player being deported if the score reaches zero, ending the game. After every mission, the player returns to their flat to interact with characters, pay any outstanding rent, and to purchase any items that they may need. While playing the game, the player must make decisions which will affect the story through various characters that can be encountered.

Plot

Setting
Not Tonight takes place primarily in England, which increasingly falls under the control of the nativist Albion First party and Prime Minister Simon Tavener. Taking advantage of social upheaval following a post-Brexit economic crisis, the British government has stripped citizenship from all Britons found to have ancestors from EU countries, relocating them to slum-like housing blocks in preparation for mass deportations.

The player is one of those residents, stripped of their identity and referred to only as "Person of European Heritage #112" or #112 for short.

Synopsis

On 31 December 2018, #112 is working as a bouncer taking tickets at a New Year's Eve ball at the British Museum when a terror bombing suddenly occurs.

The game then returns to 1 January 2018. Using their government-issued phone, #112 must take bouncer jobs in order to please their immigration officer Jupp and delay their seemingly-imminent deportation. As time progresses, #112 can make various decisions to either support the government or the resistance building up against Albion First. Jupp also conscripts the player into supporting his side hustle Jupp Security, potentially exposing dirty secrets of his own.

If #112 survives and avoids deportation and glitches by the end of the year, they are arrested following the bombing and sent to a televised court hearing. #112's - and by extension, Britain's - fate will be decided based on the actions they took over the course of the game.

Reception 

Not Tonight received "mixed or average reviews", while the Take Back Control Edition received "generally favourable reviews", according to the review aggregation website Metacritic.

Screen Rant gave an independent review of 4 out of 5 stars. Trusted Reviews summarised "Not Tonight proves that the Papers, Please formula can work in a less Soviet setting, but the experience is slightly diminished by the transplant. Yet its eccentricities remain endearing, with characters, landscapes and a haunting sound of muffled music that will be rambling around my skull for a little while yet."

Many reviewers have mentioned the likeness of the game to that of Papers, Please.

Sequel
Not Tonight 2 was released on February 11, 2022 for Windows with console versions planned later that same year.

References 

2018 video games
Adventure games
Alternate history video games
Nintendo Switch games
No More Robots games
Political satire video games
Role-playing video games
Single-player video games
Video games developed in the United Kingdom
Video games set in 2018
Video games set in London
Video games set in the United Kingdom
Video games with alternate endings
Windows games
Works about Brexit